China Northwest Airlines Co., Ltd. (中国西北航空公司) was an airline based in China, with its headquarters in Xi'an, Shaanxi, People's Republic of China. It started operations in 1989. In 2002, the airline, along with China Yunnan Airlines, merged with China Eastern Airlines.

History
When CAAC broke itself up into six major airline corporations, China Northwest was one of them. The airline was based in Xi'an. It operated mostly domestic routes but also a handful of international flights to Japan. After the acquisition the airline was renamed China Eastern Xi Bei.

Incidents and accidents
On July 23, 1993, Flight 2119 crashed while attempting to take off at Yinchuan Hedong Airport, Ningxia, killing 54 passengers and 1 crew member on board.
On June 6, 1994 Flight 2303 broke apart and crashed while flying between Xi'an and Guangzhou, killing all 160 people on board. This remains the deadliest aviation accident to occur in mainland China.

Fleet

At the time that China Northwest merged into China Eastern, the airline's fleet consisted of the following aircraft:

References

External links

   

 
Defunct airlines of China
Airlines established in 1989
Airlines disestablished in 2002
Chinese companies established in 1989
Chinese companies disestablished in 2002